Mark Beers may refer to:

 Mark H. Beers (1954–2009), American geriatrician
 Mark Beers (footballer) (born 1965), former Australian rules football player